This is a list of films produced by the Ollywood film industry based in Bhubaneshwar and Cuttack in 2004:

A-Z

References

2004
Ollywood
2000s in Orissa
2004 in Indian cinema